Cole Younger, Gunfighter is a 1958 American CinemaScope Western film directed by R. G. Springsteen and written by Daniel Mainwaring. It is based on the 1950 novel The Desperado by Clifton Adams. The film stars Frank Lovejoy, James Best, Abby Dalton, Jan Merlin, Douglas Spencer and Ainslie Pryor. The film was released on March 30, 1958, by Allied Artists Pictures.

Plot

Cast          
 Frank Lovejoy as Cole Younger
 James Best as Kit Caswell
 Abby Dalton as Lucy Antrim
 Jan Merlin as Frank Wittrock
 Douglas Spencer as Marshal Fred Woodruff
 Ainslie Pryor as Captain Follyard
 Frank Ferguson as Sheriff Ralph Wittrock
 Myron Healey as Phil Bennett / Charlie Bennett
 George Keymas as Sgt. Price
 Dan Sheridan as Phelps

References

External links
 
 
 
 

1958 films
American Western (genre) films
1958 Western (genre) films
Allied Artists films
Films directed by R. G. Springsteen
1950s English-language films
1950s American films